Phetdarin Jaruwan Somrat (born 6 June 1995) is a Thai professional racing cyclist, who currently rides for UCI Women's Continental Team . She rode in the women's road race at the 2016 UCI Road World Championships, but she did not finish the race.

Major results

2013
 1st Stage 2 Princess Maha Chakri Sirindhon's Cup Tour of Thailand
 Asian Junior Road Championships
5th Road race
6th Time trial
2014
 National Road Championships
1st  Time trial
3rd Road race
2015
 7th Overall The Princess Maha Chackri Sirindhon's Cup
2016
 4th Overall Tour of Thailand
 10th Road race, Asian Road Championships
2017
 1st  Overall Princess Maha Chakri Sirindhon's Cup Tour of Thailand
1st  Asian rider classification
1st Stage 3
 Asian Under-23 Road Championships
5th Road race
5th Time trial
 9th Road race, Southeast Asian Games
2018
 Asian Games
5th Time trial
9th Road race
 8th Time trial, Asian Road Championships
2019
 3rd  Time trial, Southeast Asian Games
 8th Time trial, Asian Road Championships
2020
 1st  Time trial, National Road Championships
 4th Overall Tour of Thailand
2021
 National Road Championships
1st  Time trial
2nd Road race
2022
 1st  Overall Princess Maha Chakri Sirindhon's Cup Tour of Thailand
1st Stage 2

References

External links
 

1995 births
Living people
Phetdarin Somrat
Place of birth missing (living people)
Cyclists at the 2018 Asian Games
Phetdarin Somrat
Competitors at the 2019 Southeast Asian Games
Southeast Asian Games medalists in cycling
Phetdarin Somrat
Competitors at the 2021 Southeast Asian Games
Phetdarin Somrat